Basketball at the 1997 Games of the Small States of Europe was held from 2 to 7 June 1997 in Iceland.

Medal summary

Men's tournament

Group A or B

Group A or B

Final bracket

5th position game

Women's tournament

References and external links
Results at the Cypriot Basketball Federation
Malta basketball team at the GSSE
Iceland national basketball team results

Small
1997 Games of the Small States of Europe
1997
Basketball competitions in Iceland